Belonophora ongensis is a species of flowering plant in the family Rubiaceae. It is native to Gabon and Cameroon. Its natural habitat is subtropical or tropical moist lowland forests. It is threatened by habitat loss.

References

External links
World Checklist of Rubiaceae

ongensis
Flora of Cameroon
Flora of Gabon
Critically endangered plants
Taxonomy articles created by Polbot
Taxa named by Martin Cheek